The 1858–59 Cape Colony parliamentary election was conducted between September 1858 and early March 1859. This was the second election for the Cape parliament, which had been established in 1854.

Despite the election, the parliament was weak and executive power remained firmly in the hands of the Governor, Sir George Grey, who was appointed from London. Rawson W. Rawson continued as the colony's Colonial Secretary. As Colonial Secretary, Rawson could speak in both the Assembly and Council, but held no voting rights.

In the Eastern Province, the assembly elections saw little excitement, with some constituencies had difficulty even finding willing candidates. Andries Stockenström and Robert Godlonton, both representatives for the Eastern Division in the Council, chose not to seek re-election.

Constituencies
For elections to the House of Assembly, the Cape was divided into 22 electoral divisions, returning a total of 46 members. The electoral division boundaries corresponded with the existing Cape Colony fiscal divisions. The only exceptions to this were for Albany, and the urban areas of Cape Town-Green Point and Grahamstown, (which were not included in the Cape electoral division), which had their own electoral divisions.

Members elected

Assembly

Council

References

1858 elections in Africa
1859 elections in Africa
Elections in the Cape Colony
Parliamentary election
Parliamentary election